"Revolution Deathsquad" is a song by English power metal band DragonForce. The song was released as the third and final single from their first major label album and third album overall Inhuman Rampage. It was first released via web streaming on their official MySpace profile in late 2006. A music video for the song was never made. The single was released for download on iTunes. The song is available as a download to play on Guitar Hero III: Legends of Rock alongside "Heroes of Our Time" and "Operation Ground and Pound". It is one of the band's heaviest songs, with screaming backing vocals, under a keyboard solo, a chugging, extreme-metal-oriented guitar, and a powerful, yet dark scream from vocalist ZP Theart toward the end.

Lyrics
The lyrics of the song are based on angels and demons in an epic battle (armageddon). This is a common theme in the band's music; however, the lyrics focus more on the evil side of the war, although it is told from the angels' perspective.

Personnel

DragonForce
ZP Theart – lead vocals
Herman Li – guitar, backing vocals
Sam Totman – guitar, backing vocals
Vadim Pruzhanov – keyboard, piano, backing vocals
Dave Mackintosh – drums, backing vocals
Adrian Lambert – bass guitar

Guest musicians
Clive Nolan – backing vocals
Lindsay Dawson – backing vocals, unclean vocals

Production
Karl Groom – mixing, engineering
Eberhard Köhler – mastering
Chie Kimoto, Daniel Bérard – artwork
Marisa Jacobi – graphic design
Axel Jusseit – studio photography
Julie Brown, Johan Eriksson – live photography

References

DragonForce songs
2007 singles
Universal Music Group singles
Roadrunner Records singles
2006 songs
Songs written by Sam Totman